This article lists the election results of the Trade Unionist and Socialist Coalition (TUSC) in UK elections.

General elections

General election 2010 

Source:

General election 2015 

Source:

By-elections

2010–2015 Parliament

Source:

2019–present Parliament

Source:

Scottish Parliament elections

2016

Sources:

2021

Regional

Source:

Constituency

Source:

Welsh Senedd elections

2011

Source:

2016

Source:

2021

Source:

London Assembly elections

2012

Source:

2021

Regional

Source:

Constituency

Source:

Combined authority mayoral elections

Source:

London borough mayoral elections

Sources:

Metropolitan borough mayoral elections

Sources:

Unitary authority mayoral elections

Sources:

References

Election results by party in the United Kingdom